Cecilia Caballero Blanco (30 September 1913 – 13 August 2019) was the wife of the 24th President of Colombia, Alfonso López Michelsen, and served as First Lady of Colombia from 1974 to 1978.

Personal life
Cecilia was born on 30 September 1913 in Bogotá to Julio Caballero Barrera and Mary Blanco Barroso. She married Alfonso López Michelsen, lawyer and politician on 23 October 1938. They had three sons: Alfonso, an economist and diplomat, Juan Manuel, and Felipe. She turned 100 in September 2013, and died on 13 August 2019 at the age of 105, just 7 weeks before her 106th birthday. She was also the Longest lived First lady of Colombia.

References

1913 births
2019 deaths
Colombian centenarians
People from Bogotá
López family
First ladies of Colombia
Women centenarians